Easily may refer to:
 Easily Ltd, a domain name and web hosting company
 "Easily", a song by the Red Hot Chili Peppers from Californication
 "Easily", a song by Grimes from Art Angels

People with the surname
 Ade Easily, former bassist of Tokyo Dragons

See also 
 Easy (disambiguation)